The Tunisia national minifootball team, nicknamed Les Aigles de Carthage (The Eagles of Carthage or The Carthage Eagles), represents Tunisia in international minifootball competitions. It is affiliated to the Tunisian Minifootball Federation.

History
The practice of minifoot has developed a lot in recent years in Tunisia, under FTMF guidance.
More generally, minifootball is taking its place in societies and the media.
Since its beginnings in 2016, the Tunisian Federation of Minifoot (FTMF) has seen the big picture, by organizing the second edition of the world cup, in Nabeul 2017. Tunisia hosted an edition of 24 nations, with headliners such as France, Argentina, Brazil and Mexico. This historic event, for a young federation, marked a turning point, and Tunisia was eliminated in the quarter-finals against Mexico.

At the local championship level, the first edition (2016) was contested with 12 teams. Since then, total number of clubs affiliated to FTMF has risen to more than 150, in four corners of Tunisia, with different levels. Latest upgrade was introduction of VAR, establishment of training sessions for minifootball coaches, and organization of the first ladies mini-football championship 2019–2020 season.

Home stadium

Results and fixtures
The following is a list of match results in the last 12 months, as well as any future matches that have been scheduled.

Legend

2019

Current staff
13 August 2021

Managerial history
 Sofyen Brinis (2018–)
 Mokhtar Tlili (2016–2018)

Players

Current squad
Squad for the 2021 African Minifootball Cup

Recent call-ups

Player records

Tournament records
 Champions   Runners-up   Third place   Fourth place  

Red border color indicates tournament was held on home soil.

WMF World Cup

WMF Continental Cup

African Minifootball Cup

Honours
WMF Continental Cup
  Runner-up: 2019
African Minifootball Cup
  Third-place: 2018

See also
Tunisia women's national minifootball team
Tunisia national under-23 minifootball team
Tunisian Minifootball Federation
Other
 Tunisia national football team
 Tunisia national futsal team
 Tunisia national beach soccer team
 Tunisia national American football team

References

External links
 Official site

National sports teams of Tunisia
MiniFootball in Tunisia
African national association minifootball teams